David Melville may refer to:

 David Melville (academic) (born 1944), British physicist and former vice-chancellor of the University of Kent
 David Melville, 3rd Earl of Leven or David Leslie (1660–1728), Scottish aristocrat
 David Melville, 6th Earl of Leven or David Leslie (1722–1802), Scottish aristocrat and Freemason
 David Leslie-Melville, 8th Earl of Leven (1785–1860), Scottish peer and admiral
 David Melville (inventor) (1773–1856), American inventor
 David Melville, minister and candidate in the United States House of Representatives elections in Louisiana, 2010
 David Melville (priest) (1813–1904), British priest and academic
 David Melville (footballer), Scottish footballer